Hubbardia belkini is a species of short-tailed whipscorpion in the family Hubbardiidae.

References

Further reading

 

Schizomida
Articles created by Qbugbot
Animals described in 1957